Martin Řehák (20 August 1933 – 25 March 2010) was a Czech athlete. He competed in the men's triple jump at the 1956 Summer Olympics.

References

External links
 

1933 births
2010 deaths
People from Hodonín District
Czech male triple jumpers
Olympic athletes of Czechoslovakia
Athletes (track and field) at the 1956 Summer Olympics
Sportspeople from the South Moravian Region